This is a list of National Historic Sites in the territory of Yukon.  There are 12 National Historic Sites designated in Yukon, five of which are in the national park system, administered by Parks Canada (identified below by the beaver icon ).

Several National Historic Events also occurred in Yukon, and are identified at places associated with them, using the same style of federal plaque which marks National Historic Sites. National Historic Persons are commemorated  in the same way. The markers do not indicate which designation—a Site, Event, or Person—a subject has been given.

This list uses names designated by the national Historic Sites and Monuments Board, which may differ from other names for these sites.

National Historic Sites

See also

History of Yukon
List of historic places in Yukon

References

 
Yukon
National Historic Sites of Canada